Paralkot Reservoir (unofficial: Kherkatta Dam), is a medium irrigation project located in the Kanker district of Chhattisgarh state in India.

The construction of the dam began in 1966 and was completed in 1981, over a period of 15 years by the Dandakaranya Development Authority under the auspices of the Dandakaranya Project. It was handed over to the state government in the year 1986 and the Kapsi Water Resource Subdivision entrusted with its upkeep and maintenance.

Report of completion of project 
According to the report submitted  on YOJANA July 18, 1965 Page 16, Irrigation canals are being built in the command area of Umerkote Dam and Pakhanjore Dam. One hundred families have been settled around the Pakhanjore Dam, and they will rear ducks and fish and also vegetables. A scheme has been drawn up for a dairy and poultry centre on the banks of the Kotri river in Paralkot zone.

Benefits 
The Paralkot Reservoir was built in hopes of benefiting the locals with better irrigation and cultivation systems.  The reservoir consists of two major gates which release water every couple of years through its canals. The artificial lake is used to store water.

 Local water supply
 Distant water supply, if water is sent to cities via aqueducts
 Local source of fishing & boating
 Wildlife habitat
 Increased water pressure for those living in the valley
 Power generation
 Irrigation
 Flood water control

Ichthyofaunal diversity 
The survey for Ichthyofaunal diversity study in the Paralkot Reservoir of Kanker District was mainly focused on Ichthyofaunal diversity. 25 Species of fishes belonging to 5 orders 11 family and 20 genera was recorded during the study. Cyprinidae were most dominant group represent by 12 species, Siluridae with 2 species, Ophiocephalidae with 2 species, Bagridae 1 species, Mestacemballidae with 2 species, Saccobranchidae 1 species, Claridae 1 species, Centropomidae 1 species, Notopteridae 1 species, Gobiidae 1 species and Cichlidae 1 species. This was the first ever study on the fish diversity of reservoir and would help in explore the fish fauna of Paralkot Reservoir.

Low utilisation of developed water resources 
The actual utilisation as compared with the designed potential is very poor, about 69%. The reason could be the low rainfall or the low maintenance of the canal system.

References 

Dams in Chhattisgarh
Reservoirs in India
Dams completed in 1964
Earth-filled dams
Kanker district
1964 establishments in Madhya Pradesh
20th-century architecture in India